City of Joy is a 2016 documentary film directed and written by Madeleine Gavin. It follows the first class of students at a leadership center in the Eastern Democratic Republic of Congo.

The film was released by Netflix on September 7, 2018.

Premise
The Eastern Democratic Republic of Congo is a region where being a woman is hard, often experiencing violence in the wake of a 20 year long war driven by colonialism. In the film, women band together at the leadership center to find a way to handle the horrible experiences they've had to live through and come out on the other side to be leaders and inspirations for other women in the region.

References

External links
 
 
 
 City of Joy in Congo| url=https://www.cityofjoycongo.org

2016 documentary films
2016 films
2010s French-language films
Swahili-language films
Netflix original documentary films
Films scored by Tomandandy
2010s English-language films
2016 multilingual films